Priapulida (priapulid worms, from Gr. πριάπος, priāpos 'Priapus' + Lat. -ul-, diminutive), sometimes referred to as penis worms, is a phylum of unsegmented marine worms. The name of the phylum relates to the Greek god of fertility, because their general shape and their extensible spiny introvert (eversible) proboscis may resemble the shape of a human penis. Some species show a remarkable tolerance for hydrogen sulfide and anoxia. They can be quite abundant in some areas. In an Alaskan bay as many as 85 adult individuals of Priapulus caudatus per square meter has been recorded, while the density of its larvae can be as high as 58,000 per square meter.

Together with Echiura and Sipuncula, they were once placed in the taxon Gephyrea, but consistent morphological and molecular evidence supports their belonging to Ecdysozoa, which also includes arthropods and nematodes. Fossil findings show that the mouth design of the stem-arthropod Pambdelurion is identical with that of priapulids, indicating that their mouth is an original trait inherited from the last common ancestor of both priapulids and arthropods, even if modern arthropods no longer possess it. Among Ecdysozoa, their nearest relatives are Kinorhyncha and Loricifera, with which they constitute the Scalidophora clade named after the spines covering the introvert (scalids). They feed on slow-moving invertebrates, such as polychaete worms.

Priapulid-like fossils are known at least as far back as the Middle Cambrian. They were likely major predators of the Cambrian period. However, crown-group priapulids cannot be recognized until the Carboniferous. 22 extant species of priapulid worms are known, half of them being of meiobenthic size.

Anatomy 
Priapulids are cylindrical worm-like animals, ranging from 0.2–0.3 to 39 centimetres ( 0.08–0.12 to 15.35 in) long, with a median anterior mouth quite devoid of any armature or tentacles. The body is divided into a main trunk or abdomen and a somewhat swollen proboscis region ornamented with longitudinal ridges. The body is ringed and often has circles of spines, which are continued into the slightly protrusible pharynx. Some species may also have a tail or a pair of caudal appendages. The body has a chitinous cuticle that is moulted as the animal grows.

There is a wide body-cavity, which has no connection with the renal or reproductive organs, so it is not a coelom; it is probably a blood-space or hemocoel. There are no vascular or respiratory systems, but the body cavity does contain phagocytic amoebocytes and cells containing the respiratory pigment haemerythrin.

The alimentary canal is straight, consisting of an eversible pharynx, an intestine, and a short rectum. The pharynx is muscular and lined by teeth. The anus is terminal, although in Priapulus one or two hollow ventral diverticula of the body-wall stretch out behind it.

The nervous system consists of a nerve ring around the pharynx and a prominent cord running the length of the body with ganglia and longitudinal and transversal neurites consistent with an orthogonal organisation. The nervous system retains a basiepidermal configuration with a connection with the ectoderm, forming part of the body wall. There are no specialized sense organs, but there are sensory nerve endings in the body, especially on the proboscis.

The priapulids are gonochoristic, having two separate sexes (i.e. male and female). Their male and female organs are closely associated with the excretory protonephridia. They comprise a pair of branching tufts, each of which opens to the exterior on one side of the anus. The tips of these tufts enclose a flame-cell like those found in flatworms and other animals, and these probably function as excretory organs. As the animals mature, diverticula arise on the tubes of these organs, which develop either spermatozoa or ova. These sex cells pass out through the ducts. The perigenital area of the genus Tubiluchus exhibit sexual dimorphism.

Reproduction and development 
Priapulid development has been reappraised recently because early studies reported abnormal development caused by high temperature of embryo culture. For the species Priapulus caudatus, the 80 µm egg undergoes a total and radial cleavage following a symmetrical and subequal pattern. Development is remarkably slow, with the first cleavage taking place 15 hours after fertilization, gastrulation after several days and hatching of the first 'lorica' larvae after 15 to 20 days. The species Meiopriapulus fijiensis have direct development. In current systematics, they are described as protostomes, despite having a deuterostomic development. Because the group is so ancient, it is assumed the deuterostome condition which appears to be ancestral for bilaterians have been maintained.

Fossil record 

Stem-group priapulids are known from the Middle Cambrian Burgess Shale, where their soft-part anatomy is preserved, often in conjunction with their gut contents – allowing a reconstruction of their diets. In addition, isolated microfossils (corresponding to the various teeth and spines that line the pharynx and introvert) are widespread in Cambrian deposits, allowing the distribution of priapulids – and even individual species – to be tracked widely through Cambrian oceans. Trace fossils that are morphologically almost identical to modern priapulid burrows (Treptichnus pedum) officially mark the start of the Cambrian period, suggesting that priapulids, or at least close anatomical relatives, evolved around this time. Crown-group priapulid body fossils are first known from the Carboniferous.

Phylogeny

External phylogeny

Internal phylogeny

Classification

There are 22 known living species:

Stem-group †Scalidophora
Order †Ancalagonida Adrianov & Malakhov 1995 [Fieldiida Adrianov & Malakhov 1995]
Family †Ancalagonidae Conway Morris 1977
Genus †Ancalagon Conway Morris 1977
Family †Fieldiidae Conway Morris 1977
Genus †Fieldia Walcott 1912

Stem-group †Palaeoscolecida
Family †Selkirkiidae Conway Morris 1977
Genus †Selkirkia Walcott 1911 non Hemsley 1884
Order †Ottoiomorpha Adrianov & Malakhov 1995
Genus †Scolecofurca Conway Morris 1977
Family †Ottoiidae Walcott 1911
Genus †Ottoia Walcott 1911
Family †Corynetidae Huang, Vannier & Chen 2004
Genus †Corynetis Luo & Hu 1999 [Anningvermis Huang, Vannier & Chen 2004]
Family †Miskoiidae Walcott 1911
Genus †Miskoia Walcott 1911
Genus †Louisella Conway Morris 1977

Phylum Priapulida Théel 1906
Order Halicryptomorpha Salvini-Plawen 1974 [Adrianov & Malakhov 1995; Salvini-Plawen 1974; Eupriapulida Lemburg, 1999]
Family Halicryptidae Salvini-Plawen 1974
Genus Halicryptus
Species H. higginsi (Shirley & Storch, 1999)
Species H. spinulosus (von Siebold, 1849)
Order Meiopriapulomorpha
Family Meiopriapulidae
Genus Meiopriapulus
Species M. fijiensis (Morse, 1981)
Order Priapulomorpha Adrianov & Malakhov 1995 (assigned its own order by )
Family Priapulidae Gosse 1855 [Xiaoheiqingidae (sic) Hu 2002]
Genus Acanthopriapulus
Species A. horridus (Théel, 1911)
Genus Priapulopsis
Species P. australis (de Guerne, 1886)
Species P. bicaudatus (Danielssen, 1869)
Species P. cnidephorus (Salvini-Plawen, 1973)
Genus Priapulus
Species P. abyssorum (Menzies, 1959)
Species P. caudatus (Lamarck, 1816)
Species P. tuberculatospinosus (Baird, 1868)
Family Tubiluchidae van der Land 1970 [Meiopriapulidae Adrianov & Malakhov 1995]
Genus Tubiluchus
Species T. arcticus (Adrianov, Malakhov, Tchesunov & Tzetlin, 1989)
Species T. australensis (van der Land, 1985)
Species T. corallicola (van der Land, 1968)
Species T. lemburgi (Schmidt-Rhaesa, Rothe & Martínez, 2013)
Species T. pardosi (Scmidt-Rhaesa, Panpeng & Yamasaki, 2017)
Species T. philippinensis (van der Land, 1985)
Species T. remanei (van der Land, 1982)
Species T. soyoae (Scmidt-Rhaesa, Panpeng & Yamasaki, 2017)
Species T. troglodytes (Todaro & Shirley, 2003)
Species T. vanuatensis (Adrianov & Malakhov, 1991)
Order Seticoronaria 
Family Chaetostephanidae Por & Bromley 1974 [Chaetostephanidae Salvini-Plawen 1974]
Genus Maccabeus
Species M. cirratus (Malakhov, 1979)
Species M. tentaculatus (Por, 1973)

References

External links 

 

 
Animal phyla
Extant Pennsylvanian first appearances